Guangzhou High School, is a public secondary school in the southern Chinese city of Guangzhou (Canton). Founded in 1963, it was approved as a national demonstration senior high school in 2008. It used to be Guangzhou No. 47 High School until it was renamed in 2018.

History
Guangzhou High School, originally Guangzhou No.47 High School, was established as a junior high school in July 1963 by Guangzhou Municipal Bureau of Education in the eastern suburban area of Liede. In July 1964 it was renamed as Guangzhou No. 51 High School and moved to a new campus in the Shahe subdistrict. In 1965 the name was restored to Guangzhou No. 47 High School. In 1968 the school began taking senior high school pupils.

In September 1985 the school was transferred to the Tianhe District Bureau of Education. In March 1986 it was approved as the key secondary school of Guangzhou Tianhe District. In April 1995 it was approved as a "provincial first-class secondary school" by Guangdong Provincial Bureau of Education

In 2001 the provincial government, on behalf of Guangzhou city, applied for the school to become a "national demonstration senior high school". This status was finally granted in 2008, making it one of only 16 such schools at that time.

In 2002 the school received a further award as a Guangzhou "Green Environment" campus

In 2018 the school was renamed to "Guangzhou High School".

References

External links
 Official Website (Chinese)

High schools in Guangdong
Tianhe District
Educational institutions established in 1963
1963 establishments in China